Biahi (also Romanized as Bīāhī, Bayahi, and Beyāhī; also known as Konārak-e Beyāhī) is a village in Piveshk Rural District, Lirdaf District, Jask County, Hormozgan Province, Iran. At the 2006 census, its population was 536, in 135 families.

References 

Populated places in Jask County